Phacelia viscida is a species of phacelia known by the common names sticky phacelia and tacky phacelia.

It is native to the coastal hills and mountains of central and southern California and Baja California, where it grows in local habitat types such as coastal sage scrub, chaparral, and sandy recently burned areas.

Description
Phacelia viscida is an annual herb growing erect to a maximum height near 70 centimeters. It is glandular and sticky and coated in soft and stiff hairs. The leaves have toothed oval blades borne on petioles.

The hairy, glandular inflorescence is a curving cyme of five-lobed flowers. Each flower is up to 2 centimeters wide and nearly white to deep blue in color with a paler, mottled center. The five protruding stamens are tipped with white anthers.

References

External links

Jepson Manual Treatment: Phacelia viscida
Phacelia viscida — U.C. Photo gallery

viscida
Flora of Baja California
Flora of California
Natural history of the California chaparral and woodlands
Natural history of the California Coast Ranges
Natural history of the Channel Islands of California
Natural history of the Transverse Ranges
Natural history of the Santa Monica Mountains
Flora without expected TNC conservation status